Ikast Håndbold is a Danish women's handball club based in Ikast. They have competed in Damehåndboldligaen, Denmark's primary handball league, since 1991.

History 
The club was founded as Ikast FS Håndboldafdeling on 20 June 1970 as a merger of the handball departments of Ikast DUI and Ikast Skytte Gymnastik Forening. Their breakthrough came in 1991 when they won the Danish Cup and reached the top division, Dame Håndbold Ligaen. They saw success again in 1998 as they won their first and only Danish Championship gold.

At the beginning of November 2008, it was announced that the professional division of Ikast-Brande EH had been taken over by football club FC Midtjylland. As a result, the team changed their name to FC Midtjylland Håndbold and switched colors from blue and yellow to red and black. In November 2017, it was announced that FC Midtjylland had sold off the handball team to a group of investors. From the 2018–19 season, they will be renamed Herning Ikast Håndbold.

Name

 1997–1999: Ikast FS Elitehåndbold
 1999–2008: Ikast-Bording Elitehåndbold
 2008–2009: Ikast-Brande Elite Håndbold
 2009–2018: FC Midtjylland Håndbold
 2018–2022: Herning-Ikast Håndbold
 2022– : Ikast Håndbold

Stadium
Name: IBF Arena
City: Ikast
Capacity: 2,550 seats, 300 standing
Address: Stadion Alle 2b

Results
Danish Championship:
Gold: 1998, 2011, 2013, 2015
Silver: 1999, 2003, 2008, 2014, 2016, 2019
Bronze: 1994, 1995, 1996, 2000, 2001, 2002, 2004, 2005, 2012, 2017, 2021, 2022
Danish Cup:
Winner: 1990, 1998, 1999, 2001, 2012, 2014, 2015, 2019
Finalist: 1994, 2002, 2003, 2004, 2013
EHF Champions League:
Semifinalist: 2003, 2014
EHF Cup:
Winner: 2002, 2011
Finalist: 2007
Semifinalist: 2008, 2013
EHF Cup Winners' Cup:
Winner: 2004, 2015
Semifinalist: 2000
EHF Challenge Cup:
Winner: 1998
EHF Champions Trophy:
Winner: 1998
Finalist: 2002
Semifinalist: 2003

Kits

Team

Current squad
Squad for the 2022–23 season

 
Goalkeepers
 1  Jessica Ryde
 12  Stephanie Andersen
 16  Andrea Austmo Pedersen
Wingers  
LW
 3  Trine Mortensen
 15  Emma Friis
RW
 6  Cecilie Brandt
 77  Line Mai Hougaard
Line players
 5  Vilde Johansen
 11  Sarah Iversen
 13  Julie Gantzel Pedersen

Back players 
LB
 4  Julie Scaglione
 21  Ingvild Bakkerud
CB
 14  Emma Lindqvist
 17  Simone Cathrine Petersen 
 93  Line Uno
RB
 7  Stine Skogrand (c) 
 19  Alberte Ebler

Retired numbers

Transfers 
Transfers for the season 2023–24

 Joining
  Filippa Idéhn (GK) (from  Silkeborg-Voel KFUM)
  Markéta Jeřábková (LB) (from  Vipers Kristiansand)
  Maria Lykkegaard (P) (from  København Håndbold)
  Amanda Loft Hansen (P) (from  Ajax København)

 Leaving
  Jessica Ryde (GK) (to  Neptunes de Nantes)
  Line Uno (CB) (from  SønderjyskE Håndbold)
  Alberte Ebler (RB) (to  Aarhus United)
  Vilde Johansen (P) (to )
  Julie Gantzel Pedersen (P) (retires)

Staff members
  Head coach: Kasper Christensen
  Assistant Coach: Christian Køhler
  Team Leader: Pernille Mosegaard
  Team Leader: Annelie Mortensen
  Physiotherapist: Mads Skautrup Jacobsen
  Physiotherapist: Christian Poulsen

Notable former players

  Anja Andersen (1987–1988)
  Henriette Mikkelsen (1997–2003)
  Anja Nielsen (1997–2003)
  Trine Jensen (2001–2004)
  Kristine Andersen (1998–2005)
  Karin Mortensen (2002–2006)
  Josephine Touray (2004–2005)
  Karen Brødsgaard (2004–2007)
  Tonje Kjærgaard (1998–2007)
  Rikke Schmidt (2006–2007)
  Line Fruensgaard (2008–2010)
  Maibritt Kviesgaard (2011–2013)
  Lærke Møller (2009–2014)
  Louise Svalastog (2007–2014)
  Line Jørgensen (2010–2015)
  Susan Thorsgaard (2008–2016)
  Fie Woller (2009–2016)
  Stine Jørgensen (2012–2017)
  Trine Østergaard (2008–2017)
  Sabine Pedersen (2014–2018)
  Mie Augustesen (2014–2019)
  Louise Burgaard (2015–2019)
  Anne Mette Pedersen (2017–2019)
  Trine Troelsen (2017–2019)
  Julie Gantzel Pedersen (2017–2020) 
  Kjersti Grini (2000–2003)
  Ragnhild Aamodt (2005–2009)
  Kari-Anne Henriksen (2005–2009)
  Gro Hammerseng (2003–2010)
  Katja Nyberg (2006–2010)
  Isabel Blanco (2001–2011)
  Tonje Nøstvold (2008–2011)
  Ingrid Ødegård (2008–2012)
  Tonje Løseth (2017–2020)
  Jeanett Kristiansen (2019–2020)
  Ida Alstad (2014–2015)
  Veronica Kristiansen (2015–2018)
  Linnea Torstenson (2010–2012)
  Johanna Ahlm (2015–2016)
  Sabina Jacobsen (2014–2017)
  Linn Blohm (2016–2018)
  Debbie Bont (2011–2012)
  Nycke Groot (2011–2015)
  Valerie Nicolas (2007–2008)
  Grit Jurack (2001–2003)
  Beáta Siti (2001–2002)
  Narcisa Lecușanu (2002–2004)
  Eliza Buceschi (2016)
  Tanja Milanović (2004–2008)

Head coach history

ALPI Legends
In November 2017, FC Midtjylland Håndbold introduced the ALPI Legends, an award presented annually to players, coaches and staffers who have meant something special to FC Midtjylland Håndbold through the time.

 2017: Tonje Kjærgaard and Sabine Englert

Stadium
Name: IBF Arena
City: Ikast
Capacity: 2,550 seats, 300 standing
Address: Stadion Alle 2b

European record

EHF Champions League

EHF Cup Winners' Cup

EHF European League (EHF Cup)

Kit manufacturers
 Mizuno (2018-)

References

General

External links
 Official site 
 

Danish handball clubs
Ikast-Brande Municipality
Handball clubs established in 1970
1970 establishments in Denmark